CIVI is a Canadian TV station.

Civi or Çivi may also refer to:

Places
Çivi, Amasya, a village in Amasya Province, Turkey
Çivi, Mut, a village in Mut district of Mersin Province, Turkey

See also 
 CiviCRM, a software suite
 Civility, civil or polite acts or expressions
 Sivi (disambiguation)
 CV (disambiguation)